Tha Sakae is a sub-district in the Chat Trakan District of Phitsanulok Province, Thailand.

Geography
Tha Sakae lies in the Nan Basin, which is part of the Chao Phraya Watershed.

Administration
The following is a list of the subdistrict's mubans, which roughly correspond to villages:

Temples
The following is a list of active Buddhist temples in Tha Sakae:
Wat Nong Nam Po in Ban Nong Nam Po
วัดนงราชธาราม in Ban Kon Song Salueng
วัดโพนไทรงาม in Ban Noi
วัดท่าสะแก in Ban Tha Sakae
วัดศรีมงคลพัฒนาราม in Ban Huai Thong Fan
Wat Nam Phing (Na Muang) in Ban Na Muang

References

Tambon of Phitsanulok province
Populated places in Phitsanulok province